Cyrtopodium parviflorum is a species of orchid. It is native to Trinidad and to South America (Venezuela, Brazil, Bolivia and the Guianas).

References

External links 

parviflorum
Orchids of South America
Flora of Trinidad and Tobago
Plants described in 1843
Flora without expected TNC conservation status